Reflux is a distillation technique involving the condensation of vapors and the return of this condensate to the system from which it originated. 

Reflux may also refer to:

 Duodenogastric reflux or biliary reflux
 Acid indigestion, cardialgia or pyrosis, all synonyms for heartburn
 Acid reflux disease, gastric reflux disease or gastro-oesophageal reflux disease (GORD), all synonyms for gastroesophageal reflux disease (GERD)
 Atypical reflux, extraesophageal reflux disease (EERD), supraesophageal reflux or supra-esophageal reflux, all synonyms for laryngopharyngeal reflux (LPR)
 Vesicoureteral reflux (VUR)
 Superficial venous reflux, see Chronic venous insufficiency